Jago (born Jago Silver on 12 November 1979) is a British children's book illustrator. He attended Falmouth College of Art from 2000 to 2003. He has produced digital illustrations for a variety of publishers: Barefoot Books, Oxford University Press, Mantra Lingua and Zondervan.

The Jesus Storybook Bible, written by Sally Lloyd-Jones and illustrated by Jago has sold two million copies  in 19 languages. In 2015 it was included in the Evangelical Christian Publishers Association (ECPA) Top 100 Best-sellers list.

In September 2014 Jago exhibited commissioned work at The Cruel & Curious Sea  exhibition in the National Trust maintained barns of Stowe Barton in North Cornwall.

Awards
The Jesus Storybook Bible – 2010 ALA Notable Award
The Jesus Storybook Bible – 2009 NAPPA Award Winner
The Jesus Storybook Bible – Gold Moonbeam Children's Book Award from Independent Publisher (2007)
 "Nachshon, Who Was Afraid to Swim" – Sydney Taylor Honour Award for Young Readers
 "Nachshon, Who Was Afraid to Swim" – National Jewish Book Award for Young Readers
Myron's Magic Cow- selected for 2006 White Ravens 
NLA Wow! Award – 2006 
AOI Silver Award – Student Section, AOI Images 28 Annual 2004

Published work
 Always Remember with Cece Meng Philomel Books 2016 
 An Ambush of Tigers: A Wild Gathering of Collective Nouns with Betsy R. Rosenthal Millbrook Picture Books 2015 
 Thoughts to Make Your Heart Sing with Sally Lloyd-Jones Zondervan 2012 
 Mowen & The Runaway Moon (A Productions for BBC/CBeebies) 2012 
 Oh No, Jonah! by Tilda Balsley Kar-Ben Publishing, 2012 
 Mr Aesop's Story Shop by Bob Hartman Lion UK, 2011 
 Children of God Storybook Bible Desmond Tutu (illustrated 3 stories) Zondervan  
 The Goose that Laid the Golden Egg by Shaun Chatto Mantra Lingua 2007 
 The Jesus Storybook Bible by Sally Lloyd-Jones – Zondervan, 2007  
 The Longest Story In The World by Geraldine McCaughrean – Oxford University Press, 2007 
 Fox Fables – Mantra Lingua, April 2006 
 Fig’s Giant by Geraldine McCaughrean – Oxford University Press, Oct. 2005  
 Myron’s Magic Cow by Marlene Newman – Barefoot Books, Sept. 2005  
 Hansel and Gretel by Manju Gregory – Mantra Lingua, June 2005  
 The Little Red Hen by LR Hen – Mantra Lingua, May 2005  
 Tom and the Giant by Will Coleman – Brave Tales Books, May 2005 
 Lutey and the Mermaid by Will Coleman – Brave Tales Books, May 2005 
 Madgy Figgy’s Pig by Will Coleman -Brave Tales Books, May 2005

References

External links

Jago illustration official website
An interview with Jago

1979 births
Alumni of Falmouth University
English illustrators
Living people
People from Wadebridge
British children's book illustrators